The 2009 United States Mixed Doubles Curling Championship was held from December 4-7, 2008 at the Two Harbors Curling Club in Two Harbors, Minnesota. Husband and wife Brady Clark and Cristin Clark won the tournament, earning the right to represent the United States at the 2009 World Mixed Doubles Curling Championship in Cortina d'Ampezzo, Italy.

Teams 
Sixteen teams competed in the championship.

Round robin

Standings 
The 16 teams were split into two pools; each pool played a round robin and at the end the top two teams advanced to the playoffs. The standings at the end of the round robin phase were:

Game results
Game scores from the round robin phase:

Playoffs 
The playoffs consisted of a simple 4-team, 2-round bracket.

Bracket

Semifinals 
Sunday, December 7, 9:00am CT

Final 
Sunday, December 7, 12:00pm CT

References 

United States National Curling Championships
United States Mixed Doubles Championship 2009
United States Mixed Doubles Championship 2009
United States Mixed Doubles Curling Championship
Sports competitions in Minnesota
Curling in Minnesota
United States Mixed Doubles Curling Championship
United States